G. N. Anbu Cheliyan (born 7 April 1964) is a film financier and producer in Tamil film industry. He is the Managing Director of the production house, Gopuram Films.

Career
Born in 1964, Anbucheziyan is the son of Neelamegam, a former headmaster based in Kamuthi, Ramanathapuram. Anbucheziyan moved to Madurai in the early 1990s, lending petty cash to street side vendors and small roadside shops for rates of interests. 
His business performed well and as a result, he moved on to advance loans to film distributors in the region and as there was a need and space in the industry to grow.
Through his business venture Gopuram Films, he started producing medium budget films and also took up the distribution part of various movies.
Also, he helped many budding film directors and producers to bring up their dream movies in big screens.

In the year 2020, he launched his venture into theatres and started a multiplex in Madurai called Gopuram Cinemas.

Filmography

As producer
 Vellaikaara Durai (2014)
 Thanga Magan (2015)
 Marudhu (2016)
 Aandavan Kattalai (2016)

References

Living people
People from Madurai district
Tamil film producers
1964 births